En slem Dreng is a 1915 Danish silent film directed by Lau Lauritzen Sr. The film stars Lauritz Olsen and Gyda Aller.

Cast
Lauritz Olsen - Karl King, forfatter
Gyda Aller - Frøken Mimim, Karl kæreste
Oscar Stribolt - Brumberg, Karls onkel
Henny Lauritzen - Fru Brumberg
Frederik Buch - "Drengen"
Carl Schenstrøm - Læreren
Julie Henriksen

External links
Danish Film Institute

1915 films
Danish silent films
Films directed by Lau Lauritzen Sr.
Danish black-and-white films